Lake of the Ozarks State Park is a Missouri state park on the Grand Glaize Arm of the Lake of the Ozarks and is the largest state park in the state. This is also the most popular state park in Missouri, with over 2.5 million visitations in 2017.

In addition there are campsites and cabins within the park.

One of the most famous aspects of the park is Party Cove which is a rowdy gathering spot that has been featured on the Playboy Channel and the front page of the New York Times Travel Section.

History
The park's initial development began in 1934 with creation of a Recreational Demonstration Area (RDA), one of 46 nationally and three in Missouri established by the National Park Service to convert sub-marginal farm lands to recreational purposes. Missouri's largest RDA, now known as Lake of the Ozarks State Park, was established three years after the impoundment of the Osage River at Bagnell Dam. Three Civilian Conservation Corps (CCC) camps were busy over sixteen camp periods constructing group camps, administrative buildings, roads, a landscaped public beach, and other facilities. In 1946, all RDAs were donated by the federal government to the state park system.

Historic sites
The following CCC-related buildings and national historic districts were individually listed on the National Register of Historic Places in 1985 under their respective NRIS number and are included in the Emergency Conservation Work (E.C.W.) Architecture in Missouri State Parks, 1933–1942, Thematic Resources:

Barn/Garage in Kaiser Area (NRIS 85000523)
Camp Clover Point Recreation Hall (NRIS 85000502)
Camp Hawthorne Central Area District (NRIS 85000526)
Camp Pin Oak Historic District (NRIS 85001477)
Camp Rising Sun Recreation Hall (NRIS 85000503)
Highway 134 Historic District (NRIS 85000533) - This historic district encompasses 17 contributing buildings and 80 contributing structures originally constructed by the Civilian Conservation Corps between 1934 and 1942.  They include several notable log structures, including a small shelter at the park entrance, the park office, the old pumphouse, and a rest room in the main picnic area.
Pin Oak Hollow Bridge (NRIS 85002737)
Rising Sun Shelter (NRIS 85000524)
Shelter at McCubbin Point (NRIS 85000525)

References

External links
Lake of the Ozarks State Park Missouri Department of Natural Resources
Lake of the Ozarks State Park Map Missouri Department of Natural Resources

Protected areas of Camden County, Missouri
Protected areas of Miller County, Missouri
State parks of Missouri
State parks of the U.S. Interior Highlands
Protected areas established in 1946
Lake of the Ozarks
Civilian Conservation Corps in Missouri
Park buildings and structures on the National Register of Historic Places in Missouri
Buildings and structures in Camden County, Missouri
National Register of Historic Places in Camden County, Missouri
Buildings and structures in Miller County, Missouri
National Register of Historic Places in Miller County, Missouri
1946 establishments in Missouri